Luís Alberto Castro Díaz (born May 19, 1981) is a Salvadoran footballer currently playing for East Bay FC Stompers in the National Premier Soccer League.

Club career
Castro has played the majority of his career for Salvadoran giants C.D. FAS.

International career
Castro made his debut for El Salvador in a February 2003 UNCAF Nations Cup match against Nicaragua and has earned a total of 2 caps, scoring no goals. He has represented his country at the 2003 UNCAF Nations Cup.

His final international was a January 2004 friendly match against Panama.

References

External links

1981 births
Living people
People from La Libertad Department (El Salvador)
Association football goalkeepers
Salvadoran footballers
El Salvador international footballers
C.D. FAS footballers
2003 UNCAF Nations Cup players